Frederick Ehrenfried Baume  (13 June 1862 – 14 May 1910) was a New Zealand lawyer and politician of the Liberal Party.

Biography

Early life
Baume was born "Friedrich Baume" in Dunedin, New Zealand, in 1862. His parents were Joseph Baume and Emilie Ehrenfried, Joseph was a photographer by trade.  Between 1877 and 1883, Baume pursued careers in both commerce and journalism before studying law. He was admitted to the bar in 1884 and graduated with a Bachelor of Law in 1891. In 1896 he established a legal practice with A. E. Whitaker, a son of Frederick Whitaker.

Political career

Upon moving to Auckland, Baume became a prominent figure there and soon entered the political arena. He became a member of the Auckland City Council as well as the Auckland Harbour Board.

From 1902 to 1905 he was one of the three Members of Parliament representing the multi-member City of Auckland electorate.

Before 1905, he had been associated with the New Liberal Party group, which disappeared after 1905.

In 1905, the multi-member electorates were split up, and he won the newly created Auckland East electorate. Baume was later considered for membership of Joseph Ward's first cabinet in 1906, however he was passed over due to his connections with the liquor trade.

Baume's health began to deteriorate and in 1909 he suffered a serious heart attack where the premature announcement of his death was reported. His health was to never fully recover and resigned in 1910 citing ill-health but died in Bad Nauheim, Germany, before the resulting by-election was held. He was succeeded in the Auckland East electorate by his cousin Arthur Myers.

Family
On 21 June 1899 Baume married Rosetta Lulah Leavy in San Francisco. She was a university graduate and had been one of the first female high school teachers in the United States. Later, Rosetta became the first woman candidate for Parliament in New Zealand, standing for the Liberal Party for the seat of Parnell in 1919. In 1921 she remarried to Edward William Kane, clerk of the New Zealand House of Representatives and died in Wellington on 22 February 1934. Frederick Baume and Rosetta had four sons: Frederick (Eric), Neville, Alan and Sidney. Eric Baume later became well known in Australia as a journalist, broadcaster and novelist.

References

|-

1862 births
1910 deaths
Local politicians in New Zealand
New Zealand Jews
New Zealand journalists
19th-century New Zealand lawyers
New Zealand Liberal Party MPs
University of Auckland alumni
University of Otago alumni
New Liberal Party (New Zealand) MPs
Members of the New Zealand House of Representatives
New Zealand MPs for Auckland electorates
New Zealand King's Counsel
Auckland City Councillors
Auckland Harbour Board members